Sotirios Nakos (born 3 January 1949) is a Greek wrestler. He competed in the men's Greco-Roman 68 kg at the 1972 Summer Olympics.

References

External links
 

1949 births
Living people
Greek male sport wrestlers
Olympic wrestlers of Greece
Wrestlers at the 1972 Summer Olympics
Place of birth missing (living people)